Belov, or Belova (feminine; Белова), is a common Russian surname, derived from the word Bely (белый, meaning "white"). Notable people with the surname include: 

People
Aleksandar Belov (b. 1987), Macedonian singer
Alexander Belov (1951–1978), Russian basketball player
Alexander Belov (sergeant) (1923–1980), Soviet army officer and Hero of the Soviet Union
Alexey Belov (officer) (1909–1992), Soviet army officer and Hero of the Soviet Union
Fyodor Belov (1920–1979), Soviet army officer and Hero of the Soviet Union
Grigory Belov (actor) (1895–1965), Soviet actor and People's Artist of the USSR
Grigory Belov (colonel) (1901–1994), Soviet army officer and Hero of the Soviet Union
Irina Belova (athlete) (b. 1968), Russian heptathlete
Ivan Belov (captain) (1906–1944) was a Soviet officer and naval captain
Ivan Belov (commander) (1893–1938), Soviet army commander
Ivan Belov (lieutenant) (1915–1941), Soviet army officer and Hero of the Soviet Union
Katherine Belov (1973), Australian veterinary scientist
Mikhail Belov (1966), Russian professional football coach and a former player
Nikolay Belov (wrestler) (1919–1987), Soviet wrestler
Nikolay Nikanorovich Belov (1896–1941), Soviet general
Nikolay Vasilyevich Belov (1891–1982), Soviet crystallographer, geochemist, and academician
Nikolay Belov (sergeant) (1924–1993), Soviet army officer and Full Cavalier of the Order of Glory
Pavel Belov (colonel-general) (1897-1962), Soviet general, commander of the 61st Army
Pavel Belov (b. 1977), Russian scientist, metamaterial researcher
Sergei Belov (1944–2013), Russian basketball player
Valery Belov (b. 1967), Russian ice hockey player and coach
Vasily Belov (writer) (1932–2012), Soviet writer
Vasily Belov (private) (1925–?), Soviet soldier and Hero of the Soviet Union

Yevgeny Belov, Russian diplomat and Ambassador of Russia to the CIS
Yevtikhy Belov (1901–1966), Soviet army officer and Hero of the Soviet Union

Other
Alexander Belov, a fictional character played by Sergei Bezrukov in a Russian crime miniseries Brigada
Leonid Belov, fictional Red Army general who appears in Call of Duty: Finest Hour
Yelena Belova, fictional Russian super spy from Marvel Comics

Russian-language surnames